The naked-soled conyrat (Reithrodon typicus) is a species of rodent in the family Cricetidae. It is an herbivore of grasslands in northern Argentina, southern Brazil, and Uruguay.

Its karyotype has 2n = 28.

References

Reithrodon
Mammals of Argentina
Mammals of Brazil
Mammals of Uruguay
Mammals described in 1837